The UK Singles Chart is one of many music charts compiled by the Official Charts Company that calculates the best-selling singles of the week in the United Kingdom. Since 2004 the chart has been based on the sales of both physical singles and digital downloads, with airplay figures excluded from the official chart. Since 2014, the singles chart has been based on both sales and streaming; in 2017 it used the ratio of 150 streams equivalent to one sale (not 100:1 as previously). This list shows singles that peaked in the Top 10 of the UK Singles Chart during 2017, as well as singles which peaked in 2016 and 2018 but were in the top 10 in 2017. The entry date is when the song appeared in the top 10 for the first time (week ending, as published by the Official Charts Company, which is six days after the chart is announced).

Ninety-eight singles were in the top ten this year. Eleven singles from 2016 remained in the top 10 for several weeks at the beginning of the year, while "Man's Not Hot" by Big Shaq, "I Miss You" by Clean Bandit featuring Julia Michaels, "River" by Eminem, "17" by MK and "Let You Down" by NF were released in 2017 but did not reach their peak until 2018. "Last Christmas" by Wham! and "Fairytale of New York" by The Pogues featuring Kirsty MacColl both re-entered the top ten at the end of the year after being re-issued and reached peaks on their current run in 2018. "I Would Like" by Zara Larsson was the only song from 2016 to reach its peak in 2017. Twenty-four artists scored multiple entries in the top 10 in 2017. Alessia Cara, DJ Khaled, Dua Lipa, Julia Michaels and Post Malone were among the many artists who achieved their first UK charting top 10 single in 2017.

The 2016 Christmas number-one, "Rockabye" by Clean Bandit featuring Anne-Marie and Sean Paul, remained at number-one for the first two weeks of 2017. The first new number-one single of the year was "Shape of You" by Ed Sheeran. Overall, fifteen different singles peaked at number-one in 2017, with Anne-Marie, Clean Bandit, DJ Khaled, Dua Lipa, Ed Sheeran and Justin Bieber (2) having the most singles hit that position.

Background

Multiple entries
Ninety-eight singles charted in the top 10 in 2017, with eighty-two singles reaching their peak this year (including the re-entry "All I Want for Christmas" which charted in previous years but reached a peak on its latest chart run).

Twenty-four artists scored multiple entries in the top 10 in 2017. Ed Sheeran had the most top ten singles in 2017 with eleven. His comeback single "Shape of You" was made available for download on 6 January and has spent fourteen non-consecutive weeks at number-one while "Castle on the Hill", which came out on the same day, peaked at number two. Promotional single "How Would You Feel (Paean)" also reached a high of second in the chart on 2 March.

After Sheeran's third studio album, "÷" was released, all sixteen tracks were in the top 20 on the week ending 16 March, and he held nine of the top 10, with "Something Just Like This" by The Chainsmokers and Coldplay the only single to break this monopoly. In addition to the singles already in the chart, "Galway Girl (2), "Perfect" (4), "New Man" (5) "Happier" (6), "Dive" (8), and "Supermarket Flowers" (9, rising to 8) and "What Do I Know?" all reaching the top ten. In response, the Official Charts Company announced plans in June to limit the number of songs by the same artist in the chart at the same time, to reflect popularity of singles rather than album tracks. "Perfect" returned to the chart later in the year after its official single release and became the Christmas number-one, with Sheeran'/ collaboration with Eminem, "River", behind it in the chart. "River" would eventually reach the top spot itself in early 2018.

Dua Lipa had four top 10 entries in 2017 with "Be the One", "Bridge over Troubled Water", "New Rules" and "No Lie". Justin Bieber, Little Mix, Rita Ora and Stormzy also had four top 10 entries so far this year.

Drake is one of eight artists who had three hit singles in 2017. "Passionfruit" entered the chart at number 4 on 30 March and rose to number three the following week. Two of his other album tracks from More Life peaked in the top 10 - KMT featuring the rapper Giggs reached number 9 and "Blem" landed one place lower.

Anne-Marie, Clean Bandit, James Arthur, Louis Tomlinson, Quavo, Sean Paul and Taylor Swift all had three top 10 entries in 2017.

DJ Khaled is one of a number of artists with two top-ten entries, including number-one singles "I'm the One" and "Wild Thoughts". Charlie Puth, Eminem, Katy Perry, Selena Gomez and Zara Larsson were among the other artists with multiple top 10 entries in 2017.

All-female top 3
"New Rules" by Dua Lipa became the first solo female UK number one since Adele reached number 1 in 2015 with "Hello". The top 3 singles on the chart on 7 September 2017 (week ending), was the first female top 3 since October 2014. The singles included "Look What You Made Me Do" by Taylor Swift at 1, "New Rules" by Dua Lipa at 2 and "What About Us" by Pink at 3.

Changes to chart rules
The Official Charts Company announced plans in June to limit the number of songs by the same artist in the chart at the same time, to reflect popularity of singles rather than album tracks.  Chart rules were altered from 7 July to help new artists break through by limiting the number of tracks by the same artist allowed in the chart at the same time to 3. The streaming to sales ratio remained largely unchanged but for songs which have spent a high number of weeks in the chart the ratio was altered to 300:1. This was largely in response to Ed Sheeran's album tracks dominating the chart, with all sixteen tracks from his third studio album ÷, reaching the top twenty in the same week.

Chart debuts
Forty-nine artists achieved their first top 10 single in 2017, either as a lead or featured artist. Of these, six went on to record another hit single that year: Alessia Cara, DJ Khaled, Julia Michaels, Khalid, Marshmello and RAYE. Dua Lipa had three other entries in her breakthrough year.

The following table (collapsed on desktop site) does not include acts who had previously charted as part of a group and secured their first top 10 solo single.  

Notes
Harry Styles made his solo debut in 2017, with his first single outside One Direction, "Sign of the Times", topping the chart in April. Likewise with Liam Payne, he made his solo debut in 2017, with his first single outside One Direction, "Strip That Down" entered the top 10 at number 3. Quavo is a member of the hip-hop group Migos, who debuted on the Calvin Harris single in  "Slide" in March 2017, two months before he featured on DJ Khaled's number-one hit "I'm the One". He would also appear with Liam Payne on his solo top three single "Strip That Down".

Camila Cabello also made her first UK top 10 debut with Havana. This also became her first top 10 since her departure from US girl group Fifth Harmony. Swae Lee had his first chart single under his own name, featuring on French Montana's "Unforgettable". He previously charted as part of the duo Rae Sremmurd with "Black Beatles" in 2016.

Artists for Grenfell recorded a cover of "Bridge over Troubled Water" in aid of the Grenfell Tower fire and featured many artists who had achieved top 10 singles previously in their own right or with a band. Carl Barat of The Libertines, Jon McClure from Reverend and the Makers, Matt Goss from Bros., Kelly Jones of Stereophonics, The Who's Pete Townshend and former Westlife member Shane Filan all had their first credited top 10 hit independent of their bands with this song.

Songs from films
Original song "I Don't Wanna Live Forever" (from Fifty Shades Darker) was the only film soundtrack song that entered the top 10 this year.

Charity singles
The charity single "Bridge over Troubled Water" was dedicated to the victims and survivors of the Grenfell Tower fire. The single peaked at number 1 on 29 June 2017, just two days after release, becoming the second fastest selling single of 2017 behind "Shape of You".

Best-selling singles
Ed Sheeran had the best-selling and streamed single of the year with "Shape of You". The song spent twenty-two weeks in the top 10 (including fourteen weeks at number one), sold over 787,000 copies as well as scoring 248 million streams (3.2 million combined sales) and was certified 5× platinum by the BPI. "Despacito" by Luis Fonsi, Daddy Yankee & Justin Bieber came in second place with more than 2.3 million combined sales. Ed Sheeran's "Castle on the Hill", "Unforgettable" from French Montana featuring Swae Lee and "Galway Girl" by Ed Sheeran made up the top five. Singles by Ed Sheeran ("Perfect"), Clean Bandit featuring Zara Larsson, Rag'n'Bone Man, The Chainsmokers & Coldplay and Jax Jones featuring RAYE were also in the top ten best-selling singles of the year.

Top-ten singles
Key

Entries by artist

The following table shows artists who achieved two or more top 10 entries in 2017, including singles that reached their peak in 2016. The figures include both main artists and featured artists, while appearances on ensemble charity records are also counted for each artist. The total number of weeks an artist spent in the top ten in 2017 is also shown.

Notes 

 "24K Magic" re-entered the top 10 at number 10 on 5 January 2017 (week ending).
 "Shout Out to My Ex" re-entered the top 10 at number 6 on 5 January 2017 (week ending).
 "Last Christmas" re-entered the top 10 at number 7 on 5 January 2017 (week ending) following the death of George Michael, having originally peaked at number 2 upon release in 1984. It re-entered the top 10 again on 14 December 2017 at number 6.
 "Sexual" re-entered the top 10 at number 6 on 12 January 2017 (week ending).
 "Just Hold On" re-entered the top 10 at number 10 on 12 January 2017 (week ending).
 "Big For Your Boots" re-entered the top 10 at number 6 on 9 March 2017 (week ending).
 "It Ain't Me" re-entered the top 10 at number 7 on 6 April 2017 (week ending).
 "Issues" re-entered the top 10 at number 10 on 27 April 2017 (week ending).
 "Attention" re-entered the top 10 at number 10 on 22 June 2017 (week ending).
 Figure includes song that peaked in 2016.
 Figure includes appearance on Clean Bandit's "Rockabye".
 Figure includes appearance on Sean Paul's "No Lie".
 Figure includes appearances on Luis Fonsi's "Despacito", DJ Khaled's "I'm the One" and David Guetta's "2U".
 Figure includes appearances on DJ Khaled's "I'm the One", Calvin Harris' "Slide" (with Migos) and Liam Payne's "Strip That Down".
 Figure includes appearance on Clean Bandit's "Symphony".
 Figure includes an appearance on the "Bridge over Troubled Water" charity single by Artists for Grenfell.
 Released as a charity single by Artists for Grenfell to support survivors of the Grenfell Tower fire.
 Figure includes appearance on Little Mix's "Power".
 Figure includes appearance on Jax Jones' "You Don't Know Me".
 Figure includes appearance on Calvin Harris' "Feels".
 "2U" re-entered the top 10 at number 10 on 27 June 2017 (week ending).
 Figure includes song that first charted in 2016 but peaked in 2017.
 "Came Here for Love" re-entered the top 10 at number 9 on 3 August 2017 (week ending).
 Figure includes appearance on Enrique Iglasias' "Súbeme la Radio".
 "Your Song" re-entered the top 10 at number 10 on 24 August 2017 (week ending).
 Figure includes appearance on Avicii's "Lonely Together".
 "More Than Friends" re-entered the top 10 at number 10 on 5 October 2017 (week ending). 
 Figure includes appearance on Logic's "1-800-273-8255".
 "Mi Gente" re-entered the top 10 at number 8 on 19 October 2017 (week ending) upon the release of the remix featuring Beyoncé.
 Figure includes appearance on Stefflon Don's "Hurtin' Me".
 Figure includes appearance on Logic's "1-800-273-8255", and Marshmello's "Silence".
 "Perfect" re-entered the top 10 at number 7 on 2 November 2017 (week ending).
 "Reggaetón Lento" re-entered the top 10 at number 9 on 16 November 2017 (week ending).
 Figure includes appearance on Clean Bandit's "I Miss You".
 "Last Christmas" re-entered the top 10 at number 6 on 14 December 2017 (week ending), having originally peaked at number 2 upon release in 1984.
 "Fairytale of New York" re-entered the top 10 at number 10 on 14 December 2017 (week ending), having originally peaked at number 2 upon release in 1987.
 "All I Want For Christmas" re-entered the top 10 at number 5 on 14 December 2017 (week ending), having originally peaked at number 2 upon release in 1994.
 "Perfect" reached a new peak at number 1 on 14 December 2017 upon the release of the remix featuring Beyoncé.
 Figure includes appearance on Eminem's "River".
  "Man's Not Hot" reached its peak of number three on 11 January 2018 (week ending).
  "I Miss You" reached its peak of number four on 25 January 2018 (week ending).
  "Let You Down" reached its peak of number six on 18 January 2018 (week ending).

See also
2017 in British music
List of number-one singles from the 2010s (UK)

References
General

Specific

External links
2017 singles chart archive at the Official Charts Company (click on relevant week)

United Kingdom top 10
Top 10 singles
2017